Beach shuttlecock competition at the 2016 Asian Beach Games was held in Danang, Vietnam from 26 to 30 September 2016 at Phuong Trang Area, Danang, Vietnam.

Medalists

Medal table

Results

Men's singles

Preliminary
27–28 September

Knockout round
28 September

Men's doubles

Preliminary
26 September

Knockout round

Men's team

Preliminary
28–29 September

Knockout round
30 September

Women's singles

Preliminary
27–28 September

Knockout round
28 September

Women's doubles

Preliminary
26 September

Knockout round

Women's team

Preliminary
28–29 September

Knockout round
30 September

Mixed doubles
27 September

Preliminary

Knockout round

References

External links 
Official website

2016 Asian Beach Games events